The Daily Republic is a daily newspaper in the town of Fairfield, California. It is owned by McNaughton Newspapers.

History
The Daily Republic started out as two newspapers – the Solano County Herald and the Solano Press. The County Herald was first created in Benicia in November 1855. It moved to Suisun City with its first publication there on October 2, 1858, with offices in a building on the south side of the city plaza. The Daily Republic was the first newspaper in the nation to editorially support Abraham Lincoln for president. The Solano Press was created in 1862. Seven years later, the Herald and the Press were consolidated and renamed the Solano Republican.

"The Republican is a fearless defender of the rights of the people, and is a welcome weekly visitor to nearly every house in the upper portion of Solano County," the 1879 History of Solano County stated. During the 1940s, the Solano Republican was housed at 607 Main St., Suisun City. The present home of the Daily Republic at 1250 Texas St. was built in 1940. Within the first year he owned the newspaper, Dean McNaughton increased the publication to five days a week, Monday through Friday, and renamed it the Daily Republic. Today, the newspaper publishes seven days a week.

Ownership
The Daily Republic had many owners through the beginning of the 20th century until 1919, when David A. Weir bought the newspaper. He owned the Solano Republican for the next 31 years. Weir was born in Sterling, Colorado in 1889. After working at The Denver Post and the Chicago Tribune, he published papers in Nebraska, Oregon and Porterville before buying the Solano Republican. Weir was also instrumental in establishing the local Lions Club, American Legion post 208 and the county's mosquito abatement district. Weir retired from publishing November 1, 1949, and sold the Republican to J. Clifton Toney. Toney operated the newspaper until 1960, when it was sold to the McNaughton family.

Since the early 1960s, the newspaper has been owned by the McNaughtons, a family with roots in journalism that date back to the 1920s. F.F. McNaughton, grandfather of present-day CEO Foy McNaughton, graduated from Columbia University's first master's degree program in journalism. He went on to work for a New York City newspaper. A few years later, he returned to his home state of Indiana to purchase a small paper in Bicknel. After making it a success, he purchased the Pekin Daily Times in Pekin, Illinois. This became the flagship paper. His son, Dean McNaughton, joined the family business during the late 1940s. Dean McNaughton journeyed to California in 1960 and purchased the Solano Republican.

In 1965, the McNaughtons purchased the Mountain Democrat in Placerville. In 1967, they bought The Davis Enterprise. Foy McNaughton joined the family business in 1973. His first job was in the composing room at the Mountain Democrat. Later that year, he moved to The Davis Enterprise pressroom. For the next six years, he worked in all areas of the publishing business until 1979 when he was named publisher of The Davis Enterprise. He assumed his present title of president and CEO of the McNaughton newspapers in 1986. He became publisher of the Daily Republic in 1995, a role in which he serves in as of November, 2017. Foy McNaughton's son, T. Burt McNaughton, was named co-publisher in early 2013. In addition to the Daily Republic, the family publishes The Davis Enterprise, the Mountain Democrat, the Winters Express in El Dorado Hills, Village Life in Cameron Park & Folsom, and the Georgetown Gazette in Georgetown, California.

References

External links
 

Daily newspapers published in California
Fairfield, California
Mass media in Solano County, California